The 2020 Southern Conference men's soccer season is the 25th season of men's varsity soccer in the conference. The season was originally slated to begin on August 28 and conclude on November 4, 2020, culminating with the 2020 Southern Conference Men's Soccer Tournament.

On August 13, 2020, the NCAA suspended all fall championships, which coincided with the SOuthern Conference suspending all fall sports through the end of the calendar year. On September 16, 2020 the NCAA voted on men's soccer resuming play for the 2020–21 academic year on February 3, 2021 as the earliest date to schedule fixtures and April 17, 2021 as the latest date to schedule fixtures.

Despite the delay, teams on an individual basis can schedule competitive fixtures during the Fall 2020 semester. Thus far, Mercer is the only SoCon team that has opted to play games in the fall.

Background

Previous season 
The 2019 season saw Furman win the SoCon regular season championship, posting a 5–1–0 SoCon record and a 11–7–1 season record. Mercer successfully three-peated in the SoCon Tournament, winning their third consecutive SoCon Tournament championship. 

In the 2019 NCAA Division I Men's Soccer Tournament, Mercer lost in the opening round to Charlotte.

Coaching changes 
The 2019–20 offseason saw Charlie Hubbard depart VMI as a head coach. On March 5, 2020, Hubbard resigned to take an assistant coach position with James Madison University. Hubbard coached VMI for one season and finished with an overall record of 1–16–0. On March 23, 2020, VMI assistant coach, Max Watson, was promoted to head coach.

Head coaches

Fall 2020 season

Fall matches 
Mercer University played competitive matches during the fall.

All times Eastern time.

Rankings

United Soccer Coaches 
During the fall 2020 season, United Soccer Coaches ran a Top 5 poll for the programs playing in fall.

TopDrawerSoccer.com 
During the fall 2020 season, United Soccer Coaches ran a Top 10 poll for the programs playing in fall.

Awards and honors

Spring 2021 season

Preseason poll 
The preseason poll will be released in December 2020 or January 2021.

Preseason national polls 
The preseason national polls were originally to be released in July and August 2020. Only CollegeSoccerNews.com released a preseason poll for 2020.

Early season tournaments 

Early season tournaments will be announced in late Spring and Summer 2019.

Results 

All times Eastern time.† denotes Homecoming game

Rankings

National rankings

Regional rankings - South Region 

The United Soccer Coaches' south region ranks teams among the ACC, Atlantic Sun, and SoCon.

Players of the Week

Postseason

Awards and honors

SoCon Tournament

NCAA tournament

2021 MLS Draft

The 2021 MLS SuperDraft was held on January 21, 2021. No players from the SoCon were selected in the draft.

References

External links 
 Southern Conference Men's Soccer

 
2020 NCAA Division I men's soccer season
Association football events postponed due to the COVID-19 pandemic